Maria Porges (born 1954 in Oakland, California, USA) is an American visual artist and writer living and working in the San Francisco Bay Area.

Her artwork, drawing and three-dimensional works in a variety of media has been exhibited nationally in solo shows and group exhibitions. The work often focuses on the complex relationship of text and image.

She is a 1992 recipient of a Society for the Encouragement of Contemporary - SECA Art Award. She has twice been an Artist In Residence at the Headlands Center for the Arts.

She is an associate professor at the California College of the Arts.

Collections 
Porges’ works are included in the permanent collections of public institutions, including the San Francisco Museum of Modern Art.

Writing and Publications 
Porges' writing has been published in Artforum.

References

Living people
American women artists
California College of the Arts faculty
1954 births
American women academics
21st-century American women